The Civil Guard Association for a Better Future is a Hungarian militant organisation involved in anti-Roma activities in areas such as the town of Gyöngyöspata in early 2011, where they have been accused of intimidating the Roma population with weapons and dogs.

The name originates from Szebb jövőt!, the regular greeting of the Levente (organization).

The European Roma Rights Centre has claimed that the Civil Guard has ties to the Magyar Nemzeti Gárda, a new group sharing the same ideology as the banned Magyar Gárda.

See also
Hungarian National Defence Association

References

Antiziganism in Hungary
Paramilitary organisations based in Hungary
Far-right politics in Hungary
Racism in Hungary
Romani in Hungary